Cătălin Pârvulescu (born 11 June 1991) is a Romanian footballer who plays as a defender for Viitorul Dăești.

Honours
Damila Măciuca
Liga III: 2011–12
Liga IV – Vâlcea County: 2010–11
Hermannstadt
Liga III: 2016–17
Cupa României: Runner-up 2017–18

References

External links
 
 

1991 births
Living people
Sportspeople from Râmnicu Vâlcea
Romanian footballers
Association football defenders
Liga I players
CS Pandurii Târgu Jiu players
Liga II players
CS Sportul Snagov players
SCM Râmnicu Vâlcea players
FC Hermannstadt players
AFC Turris-Oltul Turnu Măgurele players
ACS Viitorul Târgu Jiu players
Liga III players